John Harper was a Negro league pitcher in the 1920s.

Harper made his Negro leagues debut in 1920 with the Hilldale Club. He went on to play for the Richmond Giants and the Bacharach Giants, and finished his career in 1925 with the Lincoln Giants.

References

External links
 and Baseball-Reference Black Baseball stats and Seamheads

Place of birth missing
Place of death missing
Year of birth missing
Year of death missing
Bacharach Giants players
Hilldale Club players
Lincoln Giants players
Baseball pitchers